This list tracks the support for given candidates among the 716 unpledged delegates (commonly known as superdelegates) who were eligible to cast a vote at the 2016 Democratic National Convention, held July 25–28, 2016, in Philadelphia.  The 8 unpledged delegates from Democrats Abroad carry half-votes at the convention, yielding a total of 712 votes. Unpledged delegates represent about 15% of the overall convention votes (4,767 delegates, 4,763 votes) and come from several categories of prominent Democratic Party members:
 437 elected members (with 433 votes) from the Democratic National Committee (including the chairs and vice-chairs of each state's Democratic Party)
 20 distinguished party leaders (DPL), consisting of current and former presidents, current and former vice-presidents, former congressional leaders, and former DNC chairs
 191 Democratic members of the United States House of Representatives (including non-voting delegates from DC and territories)
 47 Democratic members of the United States Senate (including Washington, DC shadow senators)
 21 Democratic governors (including territorial governors and the Mayor of the District of Columbia).

Superdelegates are "unpledged" in the sense that they themselves decide which candidate to support. (In other words, they are not allocated according to voter preferences as the majority of delegates are.) Pledged delegates can change their vote if no candidate is elected on the first ballot and can even vote for a different candidate on the first ballot if they are "released" by the candidate they are pledged to. Superdelegates, on the other hand, can change their vote purely of their own volition. With the exception of the eight DNC members from the Democrats Abroad, who each receive a half-vote, all superdelegates are entitled to one vote (including when a sitting official or distinguished party leader is also a DNC member). Throughout this list, those who qualify under multiple categories are considered as sitting officials first, then as DNC members, and then as DPLs (for example, a sitting senator who is also a DNC member is listed as a senator).

The list below is based on the most recent information on how unpledged delegates voted at the roll call vote at the Democratic National Convention in July 2016.

Totals by group

List

See also
 2016 Democratic Party presidential primaries
 Results of the 2016 Democratic Party presidential primaries
 List of superdelegates at the 2008 Democratic National Convention

Notes

References

External links 
 Democratic Convention Watch

Superdelegates
Lists of American politicians

Democratic Party (United States)-related lists